is a Japanese macroeconomist at the Keio University. His areas of expertise are Endogenous Growth Theory, General Equilibrium, Business Cycles, Bad Debt Problem, Debt Control Policy, Macropolitical Economy. He received a Ph.D. in Economics in 1998 from the University of Chicago. His dissertation "The Division of Labor, the Extent of the Market, and Economic Growth" was written under supervision of Robert Lucas, an America's prominent economist and a Nobel Prize Winner in Economics in 1995. Kobayashi was awarded  Nikkei Economics Book Award in 2001 and Osaragi Jiro Critics Award in 2002 both for Trap of the Japanese Economy.

Biography 
Kobayashi is a Professor of the Faculty of Economics at the Keio University. He is also a Faculty Fellow of the Research Institute of Economy, Trade and Industry, and a Research Director at the Canon Institute for Global Studies. He earned his master's degree in engineering from the School of Engineering, University of Tokyo, and a doctorate in economics from the University of Chicago. He worked at the Ministry of Economy, Trade and Industry and The Research Institute of Economy, Trade and Industry and was a professor at the Institute of Economic Research of Hitotsubashi University before becoming a professor in the Faculty of Economics, Keio University.

Education 
 1998 Ph.D., Economics, the University of Chicago
 1991 M.S., Mathematical Engineering, the University of Tokyo

Experience 
 2013.4 - Faculty Fellow, RIETI
 2013.4 - Professor, Faculty of Economics, Keio University
 2010.8 - 2013.3 Professor, Institute of Economic Research, Hitotsubashi University
 2010.4 - 2010.9 Special Visiting Professor, Faculty of Economics, Graduate School of Economics, Keio University
 2009.4 - Senior Fellow, The Tokyo Foundation
 2009.4 - Research Director, Canon Institute for Global Studies
 2007.6 - 2013.3 Senior Fellow, RIETI
 2007.6 - 2008.3 Executive Research Fellow, The Center for Global Communications (GLOCOM), International University of Japan
 2007.4 - 2009.3 Part-time Lecturer, Institute of Economic Research, Kyoto University
 2005.4 - Visiting Professor, Chuo University
 2003.1 - 2007.6 Guest Editorial Writer, The Asahi Shimbun
 2001.4 - 2007.6 Fellow, RIETI
 1991.4 - Joined the Ministry of International Trade and Industry (Japan)

Bibliography

Published papers
 "Payment Uncertainty and the Productivity Slowdown," Macroeconomic Dynamics (2007) 11(2): 231-248.
 "Forbearance Impedes Confidence Recovery," Journal of Macroeconomics (2007) 29(1): 178-188.
 "Business Cycle Accounting for the Japanese Economy," Japan and the World Economy (2006) 18(4): 418-440.
 "Fiscal Consequences of Inflationary Policies," Journal of the Japanese and International Economies (2005) 19:386-93.
 "Debt Disorganization in Japan," Japan and the World Economy (2005) 17:151-69.
 "A Theory of Debt Disorganizaiton," Journal of Restructuring Finance (2004) 1(1): 1-11.
 "Forbearance Lending: The Case of Japanese Firms," (with Toshitaka Sekine, Yumi Saita) Bank of Japan Monetary and Economic Studies (2003) 21(2):69-92.

Books
 The Price of Escape (in Japanese), Nikkei Publishing, 2003.
 Trap of the Japanese Economy, (in Japanese, co-authored with Sota Kato), Nikkei Publishing, 2001.
 Economics of Balance-Sheet Restructuring, (in Japanese, co-edited with Mitsuhiro Fukao, Tatsuya Terazawa), Toyokeizai, 2001.
 Debate on the Japanese Macroeconomic Policy, (in Japanese, co-edited with Hiroshi Yoshikawa, et al.), Toyokeizai, 2000.

Recent Media Coverage 
 Rational Expectation Hypothesis and the Next Issues (Economic Trend -Economics Lecture Series, Nikkei Newspaper) 2017.2.20
 Debate on the Japan's Government debt (Featured article, Nikkei Newspaper) 2016.10.09
 Debate-Japan's Critical Fiscal Situation -Who takes this responsibility? (video, Nikkei Newspaper)  2016.10.09

Discussion/Working Papers
 "Bank Distress and Productivity of Borrowing Firms: Evidence from Japan," (with Fumio Akiyoshi), RIETI Discussion Paper Series 07-E-014, 2007. Full Paper [PDF: 279KB]
 "Collateral Constraint and News-driven Cycles," (with Tomoyuki Nakajima and Masaru Inaba), RIETI Discussion Paper Series 07-E-013, 2007. Full Paper [PDF: 725KB]
 "'Irrational exuberance' in the Pigou Cycle under Collateral Constraints," (with Masaru Inaba), RIETI Discussion Paper Series 06-E-015, 2006.3. Full Paper [PDF:352KB] / Summary
 "Borrowing Constraints and Protracted Recessions," (with Masaru Inaba) RIETI Discussion Paper Series 06-E-011, 2006.3. Full Paper [PDF:456KB] / Summary
 "Transaction Services and Asset-price Bubbles (Revised)," RIETI Discussion Paper Series 06-E-010, 2006.3. Full Paper[PDF:428KB] / Summary
 "Business Cycle Accounting for the Japanese Economy," (with Masaru Inaba), RIETI Discussion Paper Series 05-E-023, 2005.9. Full Paper [PDF:372KB] / Summary
 "Forbearance Impedes Confidence Recovery (Revised)," RIETI Discussion Paper Series 5-E-002, 2005.2.
 "Payment Uncertainty, the Division of Labor, and Productivity Declines in Great Depressions," RIETI Discussion Paper Series 04-E-037, 2004.12.
 "Is Financial Friction Irrelevant to the Great Depression? - Simple modification of the Carlstrom-Fuerst model-," RIETI Discussion Paper Series 04-E-030, 2004.9.
 "Payment Uncertainty and the Productivity Slowdown," RIETI Discussion Paper Series 04-E-029, 2004.9.
 "A key currency and a local currency? A simple theoretical model and its welfare implications," RIETI Discussion Paper Series 04-E-025, 2004.8.
 "Monetary Cycles," (with Masaru Inaba), RIETI Discussion Paper Series 04-E-020, 2004.4.
 "Deflation Caused by Bank Insolvency," RIETI Discussion Paper Series 03-E-022, 2003.10.
 "Debt Deflation and Bank Recapitalization," RIETI Discussion Paper Series 03-E-007, 2003.2.
 "Fiscal Consequences of Inflationary Policies," RIETI Discussion Paper Series 02-E-010, 2002.9.
 "Forbearance Impedes Confidence Recovery," RIETI Discussion Paper Series 02-E-005, 2002.6.
 "Japan's Lost Decade and the Complexity Externality (Revised)," (with Masaru Inaba), RIETI Discussion Paper Series 02-E-004, 2002.3.
 KOBAYASHI Keiichiro, SAITA Yumi, SEKINE Toshitaka, "Forbearance Lending: A Case for Japanese Firms," Research and Statistics Department Discussion Paper Series 02-02, Bank of Japan, 2002. Full Paper
 "Deposit Money Creation in Search Equilibrium," Research and Statistics Department Discussion Paper Series 02-04, Bank of Japan, 2002. Full Paper
 "Disorganization due to Forbearance of Debt Restructuring," Working Paper. Full Paper [PDF:270KB]
 "Debt Overhang as a Delayed Penalty," MITI/RI Discussion Paper. Full Paper [PDF:148KB]
 "The Division of Labor, the Extent of the Market, and Economic Growth," (Ph.D. Dissertation), University of Chicago
 "Financial Crises and Assets as Media of Exchange" [PDF:118KB]
 "Bad-Asset Theory of Financial Crises" [PDF:144KB]

References

Japanese economists
Academic staff of Keio University
University of Tokyo alumni
University of Chicago alumni
1966 births
Living people